Harrison Mevis (born March 27, 2002) nicknamed Thiccer Kicker is a college football kicker for the Missouri Tigers.

Early years
Mevis attended Warsaw Community High School in Warsaw, Indiana. Ranked the number 8 overall kicker in the class of 2020, he committed to Missouri.

College career
As a freshman, Mevis went 17/20 (85%) on field goals including a game winning field goal against Arkansas. He also went 28/28 on PATs as a freshman. As a sophomore, Mevis emerged as one of the premier place kickers in the nation, going 23/25 (93%) on field goal attempts. He also was a perfect 3/3 on field goals longer than 50 yards with a long of 56 yards. Mevis was also a perfect 41/41 of PATs. Following his sophomore season, Mevis was named a first team All-American.

Personal life
He is the younger brother of former Fordham, Iowa State, and Jacksonville Jaguars kicker Andrew Mevis.

References

External links
Harrison Mevis - Football
Harrison Mevis Stats

American football placekickers
Players of American football from Indiana
Missouri Tigers football players
All-American college football players
Living people
2002 births